Giulia Danielle Guerrini Genusi (born 4 September 1996) is an Italian actress and singer. She is also known for her performance as Rebecca Guglielmino in the television series Alex & Co. (2015−2017) and as Chiara Callegri in the Disney Channel Latin American series Bia (2019−2020).

Life and career 
Giulia Guerrini was born in Milan. She started her artistic career in theater plays in Roma and Milan: Alice nel Paese delle meraviglie (adaptation of 2010), Aladino e la Lampada Magica (adaptation of 2012), Quanto si Scambiano le Feste (2013), Il Viaggio (2014) and Little Shop of Horrors (adaptation of 2015). Since then, she has appeared in television series including Alex & Co. and Radio Alex, both in the role of Rebecca Guglielmino. In 2016, she was invited to the Radio Disney Music Awards. In the same year she played the role of Barbara Petersoli in the series Monica Chef. She had to move to Madrid and learn Spanish to be able to play the series.

In 2018 she moved to Buenos Aires, Argentina, and was selected to play Chiara Callegri, main character of the Disney Channel Latin American original production, Bia, starring Isabela Souza. Repeated her role in 2021 in the special movie for television Bia: An Upside Down World, exclusive of Disney+, which gave her a nomination for the Nickelodeon Mexico Kids' Choice Awards.

In 2022 she participate in the main cast of the Argentinian Netflix Original Series Secrets of Summer, starring Pilar Pascual, Abril Di Yorio and Guido Messina, in the role of the villain Natasha Rossi.

 Filmography 

 Discography 
 Soundtracks 
 2016 – We Are One (of Alex & Co.)
 2017 – Monica Chef (of Monica Chef)
 2019 – Así yo soy (of Bia)
 2019 – Si Vuelvo a Nacer (of Bia)
 2020 – Grita (of Bia)
 2021 − Bia: Un Mundo al Revés'' (of Bia: An Upside Down World)

Awards and nominations

References

External links 
 
 

Actresses from Milan
Italian television actresses
Italian expatriates in Spain
21st-century Italian singers
21st-century Italian actresses
1996 births
Living people
Italian expatriates in Argentina